WCSC may refer to:

 WCSC-TV, a television station (channel 5 analog/19 digital) licensed to Charleston, South Carolina, United States
 World Chess Solving Championship
WSPO: a radio station (1390 kHz) licensed to Charleston, South Carolina, U.S.A. which held the callsign WCSC from 1930-1989
WIWF: a radio station (96.9 MHz/Channel 245) licensed to Charleston, South Carolina, U.S.A. which held the callsign WCSC-FM from 1948-1973.